Andy Ristaino is an American artist who is best known for being a former lead character designer, writer, storyboard and background artist on the animated television series Adventure Time.

Life and work
Ristaino grew up in New England and went to school at the Rhode Island School of Design where he earned a degree in Illustration and Animation. Ristaino was friends with Tom Herpich, a character designer and storyboard artist for Adventure Time; Ristaino requested that Herpich tell him if there were any job opening on the show. Initially, Ristaino applied for storyboard artist, but failed the test required to achieve this position. Eventually, he was hired on as a character designer, before being promoted to lead designer. During season five, he was promoted to storyboard artist, but later switched to working on backgrounds after season six. Ristaino's work on Adventure Time gained him an Emmy Award win for his character designs for the fifth season episode "Puhoy". This marked the first time that the series had won an Emmy Award. In 2013 Ristaino raised over 20,000 dollars on Kickstarter to fund his graphic novel Night of the Living Vidiots.

Filmography

Television

References

External links 

Andy Ristaino's Official Website

American television writers
American male television writers
American animators
American storyboard artists
Living people
Background artists
Year of birth missing (living people)